Miguel Angel Díaz (born November 28, 1994) is a Dominican professional baseball pitcher in the Detroit Tigers organization. He made his MLB debut in 2017 with the San Diego Padres and has also played for the Detroit Tigers.

Career

Milwaukee Brewers
Díaz signed with the Milwaukee Brewers as an international free agent in 2011. He pitched in the Dominican Summer League as a 17- and 18-year old, and then spent the 2014 and 2015 seasons in the rookie-level Arizona League.  In 2016, he worked in the Class-A Midwest League, starting 15 games and making 11 more appearances out of the bullpen with the Wisconsin Timber Rattlers.

San Diego Padres
Díaz was selected by the Minnesota Twins with the first pick of the 2016 Rule 5 draft and was then traded to the San Diego Padres. Díaz made the Padres' 2017 Opening Day roster and made his Major League debut on Opening Day.  Díaz was initially used as a reliever, but transitioned into a starter role in June.  While making his third start, Díaz suffered a forearm strain and ended up on the disabled list.  He returned to the Padres in September, again pitching in relief.  For the 2017 season, he totaled 33 strikeouts in 41 innings and a 7.34 ERA.

In 2018, the Padres intended to develop Díaz as a starter, and he was optioned early in the spring to minor league camp.  Díaz began the season with the Double-A San Antonio Missions, where the Padres tried to stretch out his arm, and then was promoted to Triple-A El Paso in mid-May.  He was moved back to San Antonio in June after struggling with El Paso.

The Padres called up Díaz for a single game at the beginning of July to help rest an over-extended bullpen.  Díaz struck out four batters in one of the two scoreless innings he pitched, becoming only the second Padre to accomplish the feat.  Díaz returned to the Major League club in mid-August and stayed with the team for the remainder of the season, working out of the bullpen.  He finished with a 4.82 ERA, 30 strike-outs, and 12 walks in 18 innings at the big league level.  In his 65 innings with San Antonio, he had a 2.35 ERA and 66 strike-outs versus 30 walks.  After the season, Díaz was placed in the Arizona Fall League to improve his command and work out mechanical flaws.

On December 2, 2019, Díaz was non-tendered and became a free agent. He re-signed with San Diego the next day on a minor league contract that included an invitation to Spring Training. Díaz did not play in a game in 2020 due to the cancellation of the minor league season because of the COVID-19 pandemic.

On February 12, 2021, Díaz signed with the San Diego Padres organization on a minor league deal that included an invitation to Spring Training. On April 30, 2021, Díaz was selected to the active roster. He made his season debut on May 3 as the starting pitcher against the Pittsburgh Pirates. Díaz made 25 appearances for San Diego in 2021, posting a 3.64 ERA with 46 strikeouts in 42.0 innings of work. On October 30, Díaz was outrighted off of the 40-man roster and elected free agency on November 7.

Detroit Tigers
On March 12, 2022, Díaz signed a minor league contract with the Detroit Tigers. Diaz spent most of 2022 playing for the AAA Toledo Mudhens before finally getting his contract selected by the Tigers on September 29. 

On November 18, 2022, Díaz was non tendered and became a free agent. He re-signed a minor league deal on November 29, 2022.

See also
Rule 5 draft results

References

External links

1994 births
Living people
Amarillo Sod Poodles players
Arizona League Brewers players
Arizona League Padres players
Detroit Tigers players
Dominican Republic expatriate baseball players in the United States
Dominican Summer League Brewers players
El Paso Chihuahuas players
Lake Elsinore Storm players
Major League Baseball pitchers
Major League Baseball players from the Dominican Republic
People from San Cristóbal, Dominican Republic
Peoria Javelinas players
San Antonio Missions players
San Diego Padres players
Toros del Este players
Wisconsin Timber Rattlers players